The third season of Doctor Doctor (known as The Heart Guy outside of Australasia), an Australian drama television series, premiered on Nine Network on 6 August 2018.

This season marks the final appearance of Steve Bisley as the character of Jim Knight is killed off in the first episode.

Cast

Main 
 Rodger Corser as Hugh Knight 
 Nicole da Silva as Charlie Knight (née Pereira)
 Ryan Johnson as Matt Knight
 Tina Bursill as Meryl Knight
 Hayley McElhinney as Penny Cartwright
 Chloe Bayliss as Hayley Mills Knight
 Matt Castley as Ajax Cross Knight
 Belinda Bromilow as Betty Bell
 Brittany Clark as Mia Halston 
 Charles Wu as Ken Liu

Special guest 
 Steve Bisley as Jim Knight (episode 1)

Recurring and guest

 Annie Byron as Vivian (3 episodes)
 Lester Morris as Gordon (2 episodes)
 Uli Latukefu as Darren (3 episodes)
 Vince Colosimo as Carlito (3 episodes)
 Annabel Wolfe as Ivy Win (3 episodes)
 Genevieve Hegney as Harriet (2 episodes)
 Ellis Watts (3 episodes)
 Winta McGrath as Floyd (2 episodes)
 Miranda Tapsell as April (2 episodes)

Episodes

Reception

Ratings

Award nominations 

Logie Awards (2019)
 Nominated: Gold Logie Award for Most Popular Personality on Australian Television – Rodger Corser
 Nominated: Logie Award for Most Popular Actor – Rodger Corser
 Nominated: Logie Award for Most Popular Drama Program – Doctor Doctor
 Nominated: Logie Award for Most Outstanding Drama Series – Doctor Doctor
Screen Producers Australia (2019)
 Nominated: SPA Award for Drama Series Production of the Year – Doctor Doctor
TV Tonight Awards (2019)
 Nominated: TV Tonight Award for Best Australian Drama – Doctor Doctor

Home media

International release

References 

2018 Australian television seasons